Vatra is a Croatian rock band. The song "Tremolo", featuring Damir Urban, won them the Porin for the best vocal cooperation of 2012.

Discography

Studio albums
 Između nas, Jabukaton, 1999
 Anđeo s greškom, Dallas Records, 2002
 Prekid programa, Dallas Records, 2004
 Aritmija, Dallas Records, 2006
 Sputnik, Dallas Records, 2008
 Ima li budnih, Dallas Records, 2011
 VT, Dallas Records, 2013
 Zmajevi na vjetru, 2015

Singles

References

Croatian rock music groups
Musical groups established in 1999
1999 establishments in Croatia